Amalie Emmy Noether (23 March 1882 – 14 April 1935) was a German mathematician who made many important contributions to abstract algebra. She discovered Noether's First and Second Theorem, which are fundamental in mathematical physics. She was described by Pavel Alexandrov, Albert Einstein, Jean Dieudonné, Hermann Weyl and Norbert Wiener as the most important woman in the history of mathematics. As one of the leading mathematicians of her time, she developed some theories of rings, fields, and algebras. In physics, Noether's theorem explains the connection between symmetry and conservation laws.

Noether was born to a Jewish family in the Franconian town of Erlangen; her father was the mathematician Max Noether. She originally planned to teach French and English after passing the required examinations, but instead studied mathematics at the University of Erlangen, where her father lectured. After completing her doctorate in 1907 under the supervision of Paul Gordan, she worked at the Mathematical Institute of Erlangen without pay for seven years. At the time, women were largely excluded from academic positions. In 1915, she was invited by David Hilbert and Felix Klein to join the mathematics department at the University of Göttingen, a world-renowned center of mathematical research. The philosophical faculty objected, however, and she spent four years lecturing under Hilbert's name. Her habilitation was approved in 1919, allowing her to obtain the rank of Privatdozent.

Noether remained a leading member of the Göttingen mathematics department until 1933; her students were sometimes called the "Noether boys". In 1924, Dutch mathematician B. L. van der Waerden joined her circle and soon became the leading expositor of Noether's ideas; her work was the foundation for the second volume of his influential 1931 textbook, Moderne Algebra. By the time of her plenary address at the 1932 International Congress of Mathematicians in Zürich, her algebraic acumen was recognized around the world. The following year, Germany's Nazi government dismissed Jews from university positions, and Noether moved to the United States to take up a position at Bryn Mawr College in Pennsylvania where she taught, among others, doctoral and post-graduate women including Marie Johanna Weiss, Ruth Stauffer, Grace Shover Quinn and Olga Taussky-Todd. At the same time, she lectured and performed research at the Institute for Advanced Study in Princeton, New Jersey. 

Noether's mathematical work has been divided into three "epochs". In the first (1908–1919), she made contributions to the theories of algebraic invariants and number fields. Her work on differential invariants in the calculus of variations, Noether's theorem, has been called "one of the most important mathematical theorems ever proved in guiding the development of modern physics". In the second epoch (1920–1926), she began work that "changed the face of [abstract] algebra". In her classic 1921 paper Idealtheorie in Ringbereichen (Theory of Ideals in Ring Domains), Noether developed the theory of ideals in commutative rings into a tool with wide-ranging applications. She made elegant use of the ascending chain condition, and objects satisfying it are named Noetherian in her honor. In the third epoch (1927–1935), she published works on noncommutative algebras and hypercomplex numbers and united the representation theory of groups with the theory of modules and ideals. In addition to her own publications, Noether was generous with her ideas and is credited with several lines of research published by other mathematicians, even in fields far removed from her main work, such as algebraic topology.

Personal life

Emmy Noether was born on 23 March 1882, the first of four children of mathematician Max Noether and Ida Amalia Kaufmann, both from Jewish merchant families. Her first name was "Amalie", after her mother and paternal grandmother, but she began using her middle name at a young age, and she invariably used the name "Emmy Noether" in her adult life and her publications. 

In her youth, Noether did not stand out academically although she was known for being clever and friendly. She was near-sighted and talked with a minor lisp during her childhood. A family friend recounted a story years later about young Noether quickly solving a brain teaser at a children's party, showing logical acumen at that early age. She was taught to cook and clean, as were most girls of the time, and she took piano lessons. She pursued none of these activities with passion, although she loved to dance.

She had three younger brothers: the eldest, Alfred, was born in 1883, was awarded a doctorate in chemistry from Erlangen in 1909, but died nine years later. Fritz Noether, born in 1884, is remembered for his academic accomplishments. After studying in Munich he made a reputation for himself in applied mathematics. He was executed in the Soviet Union in 1941. The youngest, Gustav Robert, was born in 1889. Very little is known about his life; he suffered from chronic illness and died in 1928. 

In 1935, Noether underwent surgery for an ovarian cyst and, despite signs of a recovery, died four days later at the age of 53.

University life and education 

Noether showed early proficiency in French and English. In the spring of 1900, she took the examination for teachers of these languages and received an overall score of sehr gut (very good). Her performance qualified her to teach languages at schools reserved for girls, but she chose instead to continue her studies at the University of Erlangen.

This was an unconventional decision; two years earlier, the Academic Senate of the university had declared that allowing mixed-sex education would "overthrow all academic order". One of only two women in a university of 986 students, Noether was allowed only to audit classes rather than participate fully, and required the permission of individual professors whose lectures she wished to attend. Despite these obstacles, on 14 July 1903 she passed the graduation exam at a Realgymnasium in Nuremberg.

During the 1903–1904 winter semester, she studied at the University of Göttingen, attending lectures given by astronomer Karl Schwarzschild and mathematicians Hermann Minkowski, Otto Blumenthal, Felix Klein, and David Hilbert. Soon thereafter, restrictions on women's participation in that university were rescinded.

Noether returned to Erlangen. She officially reentered the university in October 1904, and declared her intention to focus solely on mathematics. Under the supervision of Paul Gordan she wrote her dissertation, Über die Bildung des Formensystems der ternären biquadratischen Form (On Complete Systems of Invariants for Ternary Biquadratic Forms, 1907). Gordan was a member of the "computational" school of invariant researchers, and Noether's thesis ended with a list of over 300 explicitly worked out invariants. This approach to invariants was later superseded by the more abstract and general approach pioneered by Hilbert. Although it had been well received, Noether later described her thesis and a number of subsequent similar papers she produced as "crap".

Teaching period

University of Erlangen
For the next seven years (1908–1915) she taught at the University of Erlangen's Mathematical Institute without pay, occasionally substituting for her father when he was too ill to lecture. In 1910 and 1911 she published an extension of her thesis work from three variables to n variables.

Gordan retired in the spring of 1910, but continued to teach occasionally with his successor, Erhard Schmidt, who left shortly afterward for a position in Breslau. Gordan retired from teaching altogether in 1911 when Schmidt's successor Ernst Fischer arrived; Gordan died a year later in December 1912.

According to Hermann Weyl, Fischer was an important influence on Noether, in particular by introducing her to the work of David Hilbert. From 1913 to 1916 Noether published several papers extending and applying Hilbert's methods to mathematical objects such as fields of rational functions and the invariants of finite groups. This phase marks the beginning of her engagement with abstract algebra, the field of mathematics to which she would make groundbreaking contributions.

Noether and Fischer shared lively enjoyment of mathematics and would often discuss lectures long after they were over; Noether is known to have sent postcards to Fischer continuing her train of mathematical thoughts.

University of Göttingen
In the spring of 1915, Noether was invited to return to the University of Göttingen by David Hilbert and Felix Klein. Their effort to recruit her, however, was blocked by the philologists and historians among the philosophical faculty: Women, they insisted, should not become privatdozenten. One faculty member protested: "What will our soldiers think when they return to the university and find that they are required to learn at the feet of a woman?" Hilbert responded with indignation, stating, "I do not see that the sex of the candidate is an argument against her admission as privatdozent. After all, we are a university, not a bathhouse."

Noether left for Göttingen in late April; two weeks later her mother died suddenly in Erlangen. She had previously received medical care for an eye condition, but its nature and impact on her death is unknown. At about the same time Noether's father retired and her brother joined the German Army to serve in World War I. She returned to Erlangen for several weeks, mostly to care for her aging father.

During her first years teaching at Göttingen she did not have an official position and was not paid; her family paid for her room and board and supported her academic work. Her lectures often were advertised under Hilbert's name, and Noether would provide "assistance".

Soon after arriving at Göttingen, however, she demonstrated her capabilities by proving the theorem now known as Noether's theorem, which shows that a conservation law is associated with any differentiable symmetry of a physical system. The paper was presented by a colleague, F. Klein, on 26 July 1918 to a meeting of the Royal Society of Sciences at Göttingen. Noether presumably did not present it herself because she was not a member of the society. American physicists Leon M. Lederman and Christopher T. Hill argue in their book Symmetry and the Beautiful Universe that Noether's theorem is "certainly one of the most important mathematical theorems ever proved in guiding the development of modern physics, possibly on a par with the Pythagorean theorem".

When World War I ended, the German Revolution of 1918–1919 brought a significant change in social attitudes, including more rights for women. In 1919 the University of Göttingen allowed Noether to proceed with her habilitation (eligibility for tenure). Her oral examination was held in late May, and she successfully delivered her habilitation lecture in June 1919.

This was an unpaid "extraordinary" professorship, not the higher "ordinary" professorship, which was a civil-service position. Although it recognized the importance of her work, the position still provided no salary. Noether was not paid for her lectures until she was appointed to the special position of Lehrbeauftragte für Algebra a year later.

Work in abstract algebra
Although Noether's theorem had a significant effect upon classical and quantum mechanics, among mathematicians she is best remembered for her contributions to abstract algebra. In his introduction to Noether's Collected Papers, Nathan Jacobson wrote thatThe development of abstract algebra, which is one of the most distinctive innovations of twentieth century mathematics, is largely due to her – in published papers, in lectures, and in personal influence on her contemporaries. She sometimes allowed her colleagues and students to receive credit for her ideas, helping them develop their careers at the expense of her own.

Noether's work in algebra began in 1920. In collaboration with W. Schmeidler, she then published a paper about the theory of ideals in which they defined left and right ideals in a ring.

The following year she published a paper called Idealtheorie in Ringbereichen, analyzing ascending chain conditions with regard to (mathematical) ideals. Noted algebraist Irving Kaplansky called this work "revolutionary"; the publication gave rise to the term "Noetherian ring" and the naming of several other mathematical objects as Noetherian.

In 1924 a young Dutch mathematician, B.L. van der Waerden, arrived at the University of Göttingen. He immediately began working with Noether, who provided invaluable methods of abstract conceptualization. Van der Waerden later said that her originality was "absolute beyond comparison". In 1931 he published Moderne Algebra, a central text in the field; its second volume borrowed heavily from Noether's work. Although Noether did not seek recognition, he included as a note in the seventh edition "based in part on lectures by E. Artin and E. Noether".

Van der Waerden's visit was part of a convergence of mathematicians from all over the world to Göttingen, which became a major hub of mathematical and physical research. From 1926 to 1930 Russian topologist Pavel Alexandrov lectured at the university, and he and Noether quickly became good friends. He began referring to her as der Noether, using the masculine German article as a term of endearment to show his respect. She tried to arrange for him to obtain a position at Göttingen as a regular professor, but was able only to help him secure a scholarship from the Rockefeller Foundation. They met regularly and enjoyed discussions about the intersections of algebra and topology. In his 1935 memorial address, Alexandrov named Emmy Noether "the greatest woman mathematician of all time".

Graduate students and influential lectures
In addition to her mathematical insight, Noether was respected for her consideration of others. Although she sometimes acted rudely toward those who disagreed with her, she nevertheless gained a reputation for constant helpfulness and patient guidance of new students. Her loyalty to mathematical precision caused one colleague to name her "a severe critic", but she combined this demand for accuracy with a nurturing attitude. A colleague later described her this way:Completely unegotistical and free of vanity, she never claimed anything for herself, but promoted the works of her students above all.

Göttingen

In Göttingen, Noether supervised more than a dozen doctoral students; her first was Grete Hermann, who defended her dissertation in February 1925. She later spoke reverently of her "dissertation-mother". Noether also supervised Max Deuring, who distinguished himself as an undergraduate and went on to contribute to the field of arithmetic geometry; Hans Fitting, remembered for Fitting's theorem and the Fitting lemma; and Zeng Jiongzhi (also rendered "Chiungtze C. Tsen" in English), who proved Tsen's theorem. She also worked closely with Wolfgang Krull, who greatly advanced commutative algebra with his Hauptidealsatz and his dimension theory for commutative rings.

Her frugal lifestyle at first was due to her being denied pay for her work; however, even after the university began paying her a small salary in 1923, she continued to live a simple and modest life. She was paid more generously later in her life, but saved half of her salary to bequeath to her nephew, Gottfried E. Noether.

Biographers suggest that she was mostly unconcerned about appearance and manners, focusing on her studies. A distinguished algebraist Olga Taussky-Todd described a luncheon during which Noether, wholly engrossed in a discussion of mathematics, "gesticulated wildly" as she ate and "spilled her food constantly and wiped it off from her dress, completely unperturbed". Appearance-conscious students cringed as she retrieved the handkerchief from her blouse and ignored the increasing disarray of her hair during a lecture. Two female students once approached her during a break in a two-hour class to express their concern, but they were unable to break through the energetic mathematical discussion she was having with other students.

According to van der Waerden's obituary of Emmy Noether, she did not follow a lesson plan for her lectures, which frustrated some students. Instead, she used her lectures as a spontaneous discussion time with her students, to think through and clarify important problems in mathematics. Some of her most important results were developed in these lectures, and the lecture notes of her students formed the basis for several important textbooks, such as those of van der Waerden and Deuring.

Several of her colleagues attended her lectures, and she allowed some of her ideas, such as the crossed product (verschränktes Produkt in German) of associative algebras, to be published by others. Noether was recorded as having given at least five semester-long courses at Göttingen:
 Winter 1924/1925: Gruppentheorie und hyperkomplexe Zahlen [Group Theory and Hypercomplex Numbers]
 Winter 1927/1928: Hyperkomplexe Grössen und Darstellungstheorie [Hypercomplex Quantities and Representation Theory]
 Summer 1928: Nichtkommutative Algebra [Noncommutative Algebra]
 Summer 1929: Nichtkommutative Arithmetik [Noncommutative Arithmetic]
 Winter 1929/30: Algebra der hyperkomplexen Grössen [Algebra of Hypercomplex Quantities]

These courses often preceded major publications on the same subjects.

Noether spoke quicklyreflecting the speed of her thoughts, many saidand demanded great concentration from her students. Students who disliked her style often felt alienated. Some pupils felt that she relied too much on spontaneous discussions. Her most dedicated students, however, relished the enthusiasm with which she approached mathematics, especially since her lectures often built on earlier work they had done together.

She developed a close circle of colleagues and students who thought along similar lines and tended to exclude those who did not. "Outsiders" who occasionally visited Noether's lectures usually spent only 30 minutes in the room before leaving in frustration or confusion. A regular student said of one such instance: "The enemy has been defeated; he has cleared out."

Noether showed a devotion to her subject and her students that extended beyond the academic day. Once, when the building was closed for a state holiday, she gathered the class on the steps outside, led them through the woods, and lectured at a local coffee house. Later, after Nazi Germany dismissed her from teaching, she invited students into her home to discuss their plans for the future and mathematical concepts.

Moscow

In the winter of 1928–1929 Noether accepted an invitation to Moscow State University, where she continued working with P.S. Alexandrov. In addition to carrying on with her research, she taught classes in abstract algebra and algebraic geometry. She worked with the topologists Lev Pontryagin and Nikolai Chebotaryov, who later praised her contributions to the development of Galois theory.

Although politics was not central to her life, Noether took a keen interest in political matters and, according to Alexandrov, showed considerable support for the Russian Revolution. She was especially happy to see Soviet advances in the fields of science and mathematics, which she considered indicative of new opportunities made possible by the Bolshevik project. This attitude caused her problems in Germany, culminating in her eviction from a pension lodging building, after student leaders complained of living with "a Marxist-leaning Jewess".

Noether planned to return to Moscow, an effort for which she received support from Alexandrov. After she left Germany in 1933 he tried to help her gain a chair at Moscow State University through the Soviet Education Ministry. Although this effort proved unsuccessful, they corresponded frequently during the 1930s, and in 1935 she made plans for a return to the Soviet Union. Meanwhile, her brother Fritz accepted a position at the Research Institute for Mathematics and Mechanics in Tomsk, in the Siberian Federal District of Russia, after losing his job in Germany, and was subsequently executed during the Great Purge.

Recognition
In 1932 Emmy Noether and Emil Artin received the Ackermann–Teubner Memorial Award for their contributions to mathematics. Nevertheless, her colleagues expressed frustration at the fact that she was not elected to the Göttingen Gesellschaft der Wissenschaften (academy of sciences) and was never promoted to the position of Ordentlicher Professor (full professor).

Noether's colleagues celebrated her fiftieth birthday in 1932, in typical mathematicians' style. Helmut Hasse dedicated an article to her in the Mathematische Annalen, wherein he confirmed her suspicion that some aspects of noncommutative algebra are simpler than those of commutative algebra, by proving a noncommutative reciprocity law. This pleased her immensely. He also sent her a mathematical riddle, which he called the "mμν-riddle of syllables". She solved it immediately, but the riddle has been lost.

In September of the same year, Noether delivered a plenary address (großer Vortrag) on "Hyper-complex systems in their relations to commutative algebra and to number theory" at the International Congress of Mathematicians in Zürich. The congress was attended by 800 people, including Noether's colleagues Hermann Weyl, Edmund Landau, and Wolfgang Krull. There were 420 official participants and twenty-one plenary addresses presented. Apparently, Noether's prominent speaking position was a recognition of the importance of her contributions to mathematics. The 1932 congress is sometimes described as the high point of her career.

Expulsion from Göttingen by Nazi Germany
When Adolf Hitler became the German Reichskanzler in January 1933, Nazi activity around the country increased dramatically. At the University of Göttingen the German Student Association led the attack on the "un-German spirit" attributed to Jews and was aided by a privatdozent named Werner Weber, a former student of Noether. Antisemitic attitudes created a climate hostile to Jewish professors. One young protester reportedly demanded: "Aryan students want Aryan mathematics and not Jewish mathematics."

One of the first actions of Hitler's administration was the Law for the Restoration of the Professional Civil Service which removed Jews and politically suspect government employees (including university professors) from their jobs unless they had "demonstrated their loyalty to Germany" by serving in World War I. In April 1933 Noether received a notice from the Prussian Ministry for Sciences, Art, and Public Education which read: "On the basis of paragraph 3 of the Civil Service Code of 7 April 1933, I hereby withdraw from you the right to teach at the University of Göttingen." Several of Noether's colleagues, including Max Born and Richard Courant, also had their positions revoked.

Noether accepted the decision calmly, providing support for others during this difficult time. Hermann Weyl later wrote that "Emmy Noether—her courage, her frankness, her unconcern about her own fate, her conciliatory spirit—was in the midst of all the hatred and meanness, despair and sorrow surrounding us, a moral solace." Typically, Noether remained focused on mathematics, gathering students in her apartment to discuss class field theory. When one of her students appeared in the uniform of the Nazi paramilitary organization Sturmabteilung (SA), she showed no sign of agitation and, reportedly, even laughed about it later. This, however, was before the bloody events of Kristallnacht in 1938, and their praise from Propaganda Minister Joseph Goebbels.

Refuge at Bryn Mawr and Princeton, in the United States

As dozens of newly unemployed professors began searching for positions outside of Germany, their colleagues in the United States sought to provide assistance and job opportunities for them. Albert Einstein and Hermann Weyl were appointed by the Institute for Advanced Study in Princeton, while others worked to find a sponsor required for legal immigration. Noether was contacted by representatives of two educational institutions: Bryn Mawr College, in the United States, and Somerville College at the University of Oxford, in England. After a series of negotiations with the Rockefeller Foundation, a grant to Bryn Mawr was approved for Noether and she took a position there, starting in late 1933.

At Bryn Mawr, Noether met and befriended Anna Wheeler, who had studied at Göttingen just before Noether arrived there. Another source of support at the college was the Bryn Mawr president, Marion Edwards Park, who enthusiastically invited mathematicians in the area to "see Dr. Noether in action!" Noether and a small team of students worked quickly through van der Waerden's 1930 book Moderne Algebra I and parts of Erich Hecke's Theorie der algebraischen Zahlen (Theory of algebraic numbers).

In 1934, Noether began lecturing at the Institute for Advanced Study in Princeton upon the invitation of Abraham Flexner and Oswald Veblen. She also worked with and supervised Abraham Albert and Harry Vandiver. However, she remarked about Princeton University that she was not welcome at "the men's university, where nothing female is admitted".

Her time in the United States was pleasant, surrounded as she was by supportive colleagues and absorbed in her favorite subjects. In the summer of 1934 she briefly returned to Germany to see Emil Artin and her brother Fritz before he left for Tomsk. Although many of her former colleagues had been forced out of the universities, she was able to use the library as a "foreign scholar". Without incident, Noether returned to the United States and her studies at Bryn Mawr.

Death

In April 1935 doctors discovered a tumor in Noether's pelvis. Worried about complications from surgery, they ordered two days of bed rest first. During the operation they discovered an ovarian cyst "the size of a large cantaloupe". Two smaller tumors in her uterus appeared to be benign and were not removed, to avoid prolonging surgery. For three days she appeared to convalesce normally, and she recovered quickly from a circulatory collapse on the fourth. "[I]t is not easy to say what had occurred in Dr. Noether", one of the physicians wrote. "It is possible that there was some form of unusual and virulent infection, which struck the base of the brain where the heat centers are supposed to be located."

A few days after Noether's death her friends and associates at Bryn Mawr held a small memorial service at College President Park's house. Hermann Weyl and Richard Brauer traveled from Princeton and spoke with Wheeler and Taussky about their departed colleague. In the months that followed, written tributes began to appear around the globe: Albert Einstein joined van der Waerden, Weyl, and Pavel Alexandrov in paying their respects. Her body was cremated and the ashes interred under the walkway around the cloisters of the M. Carey Thomas Library at Bryn Mawr.

Contributions to mathematics and physics

Noether's work in abstract algebra and topology was influential in mathematics, while in physics, Noether's theorem has consequences for theoretical physics and dynamical systems. She showed an acute propensity for abstract thought, which allowed her to approach problems of mathematics in fresh and original ways. Her friend and colleague Hermann Weyl described her scholarly output in three epochs:

In the first epoch (1907–1919), Noether dealt primarily with differential and algebraic invariants, beginning with her dissertation under Paul Gordan. Her mathematical horizons broadened, and her work became more general and abstract, as she became acquainted with the work of David Hilbert, through close interactions with a successor to Gordan, Ernst Sigismund Fischer. After moving to Göttingen in 1915, she produced her work for physics, the two Noether's theorems.

In the second epoch (1920–1926), Noether devoted herself to developing the theory of mathematical rings.

In the third epoch (1927–1935), Noether focused on noncommutative algebra, linear transformations, and commutative number fields.

Although the results of Noether's first epoch were impressive and useful, her fame among mathematicians rests more on the groundbreaking work she did in her second and third epochs, as noted by Hermann Weyl and B.L. van der Waerden in their obituaries of her.

In these epochs, she was not merely applying ideas and methods of earlier mathematicians; rather, she was crafting new systems of mathematical definitions that would be used by future mathematicians. In particular, she developed a completely new theory of ideals in rings, generalizing earlier work of Richard Dedekind. She is also renowned for developing ascending chain conditions, a simple finiteness condition that yielded powerful results in her hands. Such conditions and the theory of ideals enabled Noether to generalize many older results and to treat old problems from a new perspective, such as elimination theory and the algebraic varieties that had been studied by her father.

Historical context
In the century from 1832 to Noether's death in 1935, the field of mathematics – specifically algebra – underwent a profound revolution, whose reverberations are still being felt. Mathematicians of previous centuries had worked on practical methods for solving specific types of equations, e.g., cubic, quartic, and quintic equations, as well as on the related problem of constructing regular polygons using compass and straightedge. Beginning with Carl Friedrich Gauss's 1832 proof that prime numbers such as five can be factored in Gaussian integers, Évariste Galois's introduction of permutation groups in 1832 (although, because of his death, his papers were published only in 1846, by Liouville), William Rowan Hamilton's discovery of quaternions in 1843, and Arthur Cayley's more modern definition of groups in 1854, research turned to determining the properties of ever-more-abstract systems defined by ever-more-universal rules. Noether's most important contributions to mathematics were to the development of this new field, abstract algebra.

Background on abstract algebra and begriffliche Mathematik (conceptual mathematics)
Two of the most basic objects in abstract algebra are groups and rings.

A group consists of a set of elements and a single operation which combines a first and a second element and returns a third. The operation must satisfy certain constraints for it to determine a group: It must be closed (when applied to any pair of elements of the associated set, the generated element must also be a member of that set), it must be associative, there must be an identity element (an element which, when combined with another element using the operation, results in the original element, such as adding zero to a number or multiplying it by one), and for every element there must be an inverse element.

A ring likewise, has a set of elements, but now has two operations. The first operation must make the set a commutative group, and the second operation is associative and distributive with respect to the first operation. It may or may not be commutative; this means that the result of applying the operation to a first and a second element is the same as to the second and first – the order of the elements does not matter. If every non-zero element has a multiplicative inverse (an element x such that a x = x a = 1 ), the ring is called a division ring. A field is defined as a commutative division ring.

Groups are frequently studied through group representations. In their most general form, these consist of a choice of group, a set, and an action of the group on the set, that is, an operation which takes an element of the group and an element of the set and returns an element of the set. Most often, the set is a vector space, and the group represents symmetries of the vector space. For example, there is a group which represents the rigid rotations of space. This is a type of symmetry of space, because space itself does not change when it is rotated even though the positions of objects in it do. Noether used these sorts of symmetries in her work on invariants in physics.

A powerful way of studying rings is through their modules. A module consists of a choice of ring, another set, usually distinct from the underlying set of the ring and called the underlying set of the module, an operation on pairs of elements of the underlying set of the module, and an operation which takes an element of the ring and an element of the module and returns an element of the module.

The underlying set of the module and its operation must form a group. A module is a ring-theoretic version of a group representation: Ignoring the second ring operation and the operation on pairs of module elements determines a group representation. The real utility of modules is that the kinds of modules that exist and their interactions, reveal the structure of the ring in ways that are not apparent from the ring itself. An important special case of this is an algebra. (The word algebra means both a subject within mathematics as well as an object studied in the subject of algebra.) An algebra consists of a choice of two rings and an operation which takes an element from each ring and returns an element of the second ring. This operation makes the second ring into a module over the first. Often the first ring is a field.

Words such as "element" and "combining operation" are very general, and can be applied to many real-world and abstract situations. Any set of things that obeys all the rules for one (or two) operation(s) is, by definition, a group (or ring), and obeys all theorems about groups (or rings). Integer numbers, and the operations of addition and multiplication, are just one example. For example, the elements might be computer data words, where the first combining operation is exclusive or and the second is logical conjunction. Theorems of abstract algebra are powerful because they are general; they govern many systems. It might be imagined that little could be concluded about objects defined with so few properties, but precisely therein lay Noether's gift to discover the maximum that could be concluded from a given set of properties, or conversely, to identify the minimum set, the essential properties responsible for a particular observation. Unlike most mathematicians, she did not make abstractions by generalizing from known examples; rather, she worked directly with the abstractions. In his obituary of Noether, her student van der Waerden recalled that

This is the begriffliche Mathematik (purely conceptual mathematics) that was characteristic of Noether. This style of mathematics was consequently adopted by other mathematicians, especially in the (then new) field of abstract algebra.

Example: Integers as a ring
The integers form a commutative ring whose elements are the integers, and the combining operations are addition and multiplication. Any pair of integers can be added or multiplied, always resulting in another integer, and the first operation, addition, is commutative, i.e., for any elements a and b in the ring, a + b = b + a. The second operation, multiplication, also is commutative, but that need not be true for other rings, meaning that a combined with b might be different from b combined with a. Examples of noncommutative rings include matrices and quaternions. The integers do not form a division ring, because the second operation cannot always be inverted; there is no integer a such that 3 × a = 1.

The integers have additional properties which do not generalize to all commutative rings. An important example is the fundamental theorem of arithmetic, which says that every positive integer can be factored uniquely into prime numbers. Unique factorizations do not always exist in other rings, but Noether found a unique factorization theorem, now called the Lasker–Noether theorem, for the ideals of many rings. Much of Noether's work lay in determining what properties do hold for all rings, in devising novel analogs of the old integer theorems, and in determining the minimal set of assumptions required to yield certain properties of rings.

First epoch (1908–1919): Algebraic invariant theory

Much of Noether's work in the first epoch of her career was associated with invariant theory, principally algebraic invariant theory. Invariant theory is concerned with expressions that remain constant (invariant) under a group of transformations. As an everyday example, if a rigid yardstick is rotated, the coordinates (x1, y1, z1) and (x2, y2, z2) of its endpoints change, but its length L given by the formula  L2 = Δx2 + Δy2 + Δz2 remains the same. Invariant theory was an active area of research in the later nineteenth century, prompted in part by Felix Klein's Erlangen program, according to which different types of geometry should be characterized by their invariants under transformations, e.g., the cross-ratio of projective geometry.

An example of an invariant is the discriminant B2 − 4 A C of a binary quadratic form x·A x + y·B x + y·C y , where x and y are vectors and "·" is the dot product or "inner product" for the vectors. A, B, and C are linear operators on the vectors – typically matrices.

The discriminant is called "invariant" because it is not changed by linear substitutions x → a x + b y, y → c x + d y with determinant a d − b c = 1 . These substitutions form the special linear group SL2.

One can ask for all polynomials in A, B, and C that are unchanged by the action of SL2; these are called the invariants of binary quadratic forms and turn out to be the polynomials in the discriminant.

More generally, one can ask for the invariants of homogeneous polynomials A0 xr y0 + ... + Ar x0 yr of higher degree, which will be certain polynomials in the coefficients A0, ..., Ar, and more generally still, one can ask the similar question for homogeneous polynomials in more than two variables.

One of the main goals of invariant theory was to solve the "finite basis problem". The sum or product of any two invariants is invariant, and the finite basis problem asked whether it was possible to get all the invariants by starting with a finite list of invariants, called generators, and then, adding or multiplying the generators together. For example, the discriminant gives a finite basis (with one element) for the invariants of binary quadratic forms.

Noether's advisor, Paul Gordan, was known as the "king of invariant theory", and his chief contribution to mathematics was his 1870 solution of the finite basis problem for invariants of homogeneous polynomials in two variables. He proved this by giving a constructive method for finding all of the invariants and their generators, but was not able to carry out this constructive approach for invariants in three or more variables. In 1890, David Hilbert proved a similar statement for the invariants of homogeneous polynomials in any number of variables. Furthermore, his method worked, not only for the special linear group, but also for some of its subgroups such as the special orthogonal group.

First epoch (1908–1919): Galois theory
Galois theory concerns transformations of number fields that permute the roots of an equation. Consider a polynomial equation of a variable x of degree n, in which the coefficients are drawn from some ground field, which might be, for example, the field of real numbers, rational numbers, or the integers modulo 7. There may or may not be choices of x, which make this polynomial evaluate to zero. Such choices, if they exist, are called roots. If the polynomial is x2 + 1 and the field is the real numbers, then the polynomial has no roots, because any choice of x makes the polynomial greater than or equal to one. If the field is extended, however, then the polynomial may gain roots, and if it is extended enough, then it always has a number of roots equal to its degree.

Continuing the previous example, if the field is enlarged to the complex numbers, then the polynomial gains two roots, +i and −i, where i is the imaginary unit, that is, i 2 = −1 . More generally, the extension field in which a polynomial can be factored into its roots is known as the splitting field of the polynomial.

The Galois group of a polynomial is the set of all transformations of the splitting field which preserve the ground field and the roots of the polynomial. (In mathematical jargon, these transformations are called automorphisms.) The Galois group of  consists of two elements: The identity transformation, which sends every complex number to itself, and complex conjugation, which sends +i to −i. Since the Galois group does not change the ground field, it leaves the coefficients of the polynomial unchanged, so it must leave the set of all roots unchanged. Each root can move to another root, however, so transformation determines a permutation of the n roots among themselves. The significance of the Galois group derives from the fundamental theorem of Galois theory, which proves that the fields lying between the ground field and the splitting field are in one-to-one correspondence with the subgroups of the Galois group.

In 1918, Noether published a paper on the inverse Galois problem. Instead of determining the Galois group of transformations of a given field and its extension, Noether asked whether, given a field and a group, it always is possible to find an extension of the field that has the given group as its Galois group. She reduced this to "Noether's problem", which asks whether the fixed field of a subgroup G of the permutation group Sn acting on the field  k(x1, ... , xn) always is a pure transcendental extension of the field k. (She first mentioned this problem in a 1913 paper, where she attributed the problem to her colleague Fischer.) She showed this was true for  n = 2, 3, or 4. In 1969, R.G. Swan found a counter-example to Noether's problem, with  n = 47 and G a cyclic group of order 47 (although this group can be realized as a Galois group over the rationals in other ways). The inverse Galois problem remains unsolved.

First epoch (1908–1919): Physics

Noether was brought to Göttingen in 1915 by David Hilbert and Felix Klein, who wanted her expertise in invariant theory to help them in understanding general relativity, a geometrical theory of gravitation developed mainly by Albert Einstein. Hilbert had observed that the conservation of energy seemed to be violated in general relativity, because gravitational energy could itself gravitate. Noether provided the resolution of this paradox, and a fundamental tool of modern theoretical physics, with Noether's first theorem, which she proved in 1915, but did not publish until 1918. She not only solved the problem for general relativity, but also determined the conserved quantities for every system of physical laws that possesses some continuous symmetry. Upon receiving her work, Einstein wrote to Hilbert:

For illustration, if a physical system behaves the same, regardless of how it is oriented in space, the physical laws that govern it are rotationally symmetric; from this symmetry, Noether's theorem shows the angular momentum of the system must be conserved. The physical system itself need not be symmetric; a jagged asteroid tumbling in space conserves angular momentum despite its asymmetry. Rather, the symmetry of the physical laws governing the system is responsible for the conservation law. As another example, if a physical experiment has the same outcome at any place and at any time, then its laws are symmetric under continuous translations in space and time; by Noether's theorem, these symmetries account for the conservation laws of linear momentum and energy within this system, respectively.

Noether's theorem has become a fundamental tool of modern theoretical physics, both because of the insight it gives into conservation laws, and also, as a practical calculation tool. Her theorem allows researchers to determine the conserved quantities from the observed symmetries of a physical system. Conversely, it facilitates the description of a physical system based on classes of hypothetical physical laws. For illustration, suppose that a new physical phenomenon is discovered. Noether's theorem provides a test for theoretical models of the phenomenon:If the theory has a continuous symmetry, then Noether's theorem guarantees that the theory has a conserved quantity, and for the theory to be correct, this conservation must be observable in experiments.

Second epoch (1920–1926): Ascending and descending chain conditions
In this epoch, Noether became famous for her deft use of ascending (Teilerkettensatz) or descending (Vielfachenkettensatz) chain conditions. A sequence of non-empty subsets A1, A2, A3, etc. of a set S is usually said to be ascending, if each is a subset of the next

Conversely, a sequence of subsets of S is called descending if each contains the next subset:

A chain becomes constant after a finite number of steps if there is an n such that  for all m ≥ n. A collection of subsets of a given set satisfies the ascending chain condition if any ascending sequence becomes constant after a finite number of steps. It satisfies the descending chain condition if any descending sequence becomes constant after a finite number of steps.

Ascending and descending chain conditions are general, meaning that they can be applied to many types of mathematical objects—and, on the surface, they might not seem very powerful. Noether showed how to exploit such conditions, however, to maximum advantage.

For example: How to use chain conditions to show that every set of sub-objects has a maximal/minimal element or that a complex object can be generated by a smaller number of elements. These conclusions often are crucial steps in a proof.

Many types of objects in abstract algebra can satisfy chain conditions, and usually if they satisfy an ascending chain condition, they are called Noetherian in her honor. By definition, a Noetherian ring satisfies an ascending chain condition on its left and right ideals, whereas a Noetherian group is defined as a group in which every strictly ascending chain of subgroups is finite. A Noetherian module is a module in which every strictly ascending chain of submodules becomes constant after a finite number of steps. A Noetherian space is a topological space in which every strictly ascending chain of open subspaces becomes constant after a finite number of steps; this definition makes the spectrum of a Noetherian ring a Noetherian topological space.

The chain condition often is "inherited" by sub-objects. For example, all subspaces of a Noetherian space, are Noetherian themselves; all subgroups and quotient groups of a Noetherian group are likewise, Noetherian; and, mutatis mutandis, the same holds for submodules and quotient modules of a Noetherian module. All quotient rings of a Noetherian ring are Noetherian, but that does not necessarily hold for its subrings. The chain condition also may be inherited by combinations or extensions of a Noetherian object. For example, finite direct sums of Noetherian rings are Noetherian, as is the ring of formal power series over a Noetherian ring.

Another application of such chain conditions is in Noetherian induction—also known as well-founded induction—which is a generalization of mathematical induction. It frequently is used to reduce general statements about collections of objects to statements about specific objects in that collection. Suppose that S is a partially ordered set. One way of proving a statement about the objects of S is to assume the existence of a counterexample and deduce a contradiction, thereby proving the contrapositive of the original statement. The basic premise of Noetherian induction is that every non-empty subset of S contains a minimal element. In particular, the set of all counterexamples contains a minimal element, the minimal counterexample. In order to prove the original statement, therefore, it suffices to prove something seemingly much weaker: For any counter-example, there is a smaller counter-example.

Second epoch (1920–1926): Commutative rings, ideals, and modules
Noether's paper, Idealtheorie in Ringbereichen (Theory of Ideals in Ring Domains, 1921), is the foundation of general commutative ring theory, and gives one of the first general definitions of a commutative ring. Before her paper, most results in commutative algebra were restricted to special examples of commutative rings, such as polynomial rings over fields or rings of algebraic integers. Noether proved that in a ring which satisfies the ascending chain condition on ideals, every ideal is finitely generated. In 1943, French mathematician Claude Chevalley coined the term, Noetherian ring, to describe this property. A major result in Noether's 1921 paper is the Lasker–Noether theorem, which extends Lasker's theorem on the primary decomposition of ideals of polynomial rings to all Noetherian rings. The Lasker–Noether theorem can be viewed as a generalization of the fundamental theorem of arithmetic which states that any positive integer can be expressed as a product of prime numbers, and that this decomposition is unique.

Noether's work Abstrakter Aufbau der Idealtheorie in algebraischen Zahl- und Funktionenkörpern (Abstract Structure of the Theory of Ideals in Algebraic Number and Function Fields, 1927) characterized the rings in which the ideals have unique factorization into prime ideals as the Dedekind domains: integral domains that are Noetherian, 0- or 1-dimensional, and integrally closed in their quotient fields. This paper also contains what now are called the isomorphism theorems, which describe some fundamental natural isomorphisms, and some other basic results on Noetherian and Artinian modules.

Second epoch (1920–1926): Elimination theory
In 1923–1924, Noether applied her ideal theory to elimination theory in a formulation that she attributed to her student, Kurt Hentzelt. She showed that fundamental theorems about the factorization of polynomials could be carried over directly. Traditionally, elimination theory is concerned with eliminating one or more variables from a system of polynomial equations, usually by the method of resultants.

For illustration, a system of equations often can be written in the form   M v = 0   where a matrix (or linear transform)   M   (without the variable x) times a vector v (that only has non-zero powers of x) is equal to the zero vector, 0. Hence, the determinant of the matrix   M   must be zero, providing a new equation in which the variable x has been eliminated.

Second epoch (1920–1926): Invariant theory of finite groups
Techniques such as Hilbert's original non-constructive solution to the finite basis problem could not be used to get quantitative information about the invariants of a group action, and furthermore, they did not apply to all group actions. In her 1915 paper, Noether found a solution to the finite basis problem for a finite group of transformations   G   acting on a finite-dimensional vector space over a field of characteristic zero. Her solution shows that the ring of invariants is generated by homogeneous invariants whose degree is less than, or equal to, the order of the finite group; this is called Noether's bound. Her paper gave two proofs of Noether's bound, both of which also work when the characteristic of the field is coprime to |G|! (the factorial of the order |G| of the group G). The degrees of generators need not satisfy Noether's bound when the characteristic of the field divides the number |G|, but Noether was not able to determine whether this bound was correct when the characteristic of the field divides |G|! but not |G|. For many years, determining the truth or falsehood of this bound for this particular case was an open problem, called "Noether's gap". It was finally solved independently by Fleischmann in 2000 and Fogarty in 2001, who both showed that the bound remains true.

In her 1926 paper, Noether extended Hilbert's theorem to representations of a finite group over any field; the new case that did not follow from Hilbert's work is when the characteristic of the field divides the order of the group. Noether's result was later extended by William Haboush to all reductive groups by his proof of the Mumford conjecture. In this paper Noether also introduced the Noether normalization lemma, showing that a finitely generated domain A over a field k has a set {x1, ..., xn} of algebraically independent elements such that A is integral over k[x1, ..., xn].

Second epoch (1920–1926): Contributions to topology

As noted by Pavel Alexandrov and Hermann Weyl in their obituaries, Noether's contributions to topology illustrate her generosity with ideas and how her insights could transform entire fields of mathematics. In topology, mathematicians study the properties of objects that remain invariant even under deformation, properties such as their connectedness. An old joke is that "a topologist cannot distinguish a donut from a coffee mug", since they can be continuously deformed into one another.

Noether is credited with fundamental ideas that led to the development of algebraic topology from the earlier combinatorial topology, specifically, the idea of homology groups. According to the account of Alexandrov, Noether attended lectures given by Heinz Hopf and by him in the summers of 1926 and 1927, where "she continually made observations which were often deep and subtle" and he continues that,

Noether's suggestion that topology be studied algebraically was adopted immediately by Hopf, Alexandrov, and others, and it became a frequent topic of discussion among the mathematicians of Göttingen. Noether observed that her idea of a Betti group makes the Euler–Poincaré formula simpler to understand, and Hopf's own work on this subject "bears the imprint of these remarks of Emmy Noether". Noether mentions her own topology ideas only as an aside in a 1926 publication, where she cites it as an application of group theory.

This algebraic approach to topology was also developed independently in Austria. In a 1926–1927 course given in Vienna, Leopold Vietoris defined a homology group, which was developed by Walther Mayer, into an axiomatic definition in 1928.

Third epoch (1927–1935): Hypercomplex numbers and representation theory
Much work on hypercomplex numbers and group representations was carried out in the nineteenth and early twentieth centuries, but remained disparate. Noether united these results and gave the first general representation theory of groups and algebras.

Briefly, Noether subsumed the structure theory of associative algebras and the representation theory of groups into a single arithmetic theory of modules and ideals in rings satisfying ascending chain conditions. This single work by Noether was of fundamental importance for the development of modern algebra.

Third epoch (1927–1935): Noncommutative algebra
Noether also was responsible for a number of other advances in the field of algebra. With Emil Artin, Richard Brauer, and Helmut Hasse, she founded the theory of central simple algebras.

A paper by Noether, Helmut Hasse, and Richard Brauer pertains to division algebras, which are algebraic systems in which division is possible. They proved two important theorems: a local-global theorem stating that if a finite-dimensional central division algebra over a number field splits locally everywhere then it splits globally (so is trivial), and from this, deduced their Hauptsatz ("main theorem"):every finite dimensional central division algebra over an algebraic number field F splits over a cyclic cyclotomic extension.These theorems allow one to classify all finite-dimensional central division algebras over a given number field. A subsequent paper by Noether showed, as a special case of a more general theorem, that all maximal subfields of a division algebra D are splitting fields. This paper also contains the Skolem–Noether theorem which states that any two embeddings of an extension of a field k into a finite-dimensional central simple algebra over k, are conjugate. The Brauer–Noether theorem gives a characterization of the splitting fields of a central division algebra over a field.

Assessment, recognition, and memorials

Noether's work continues to be relevant for the development of theoretical physics and mathematics and she is consistently ranked as one of the greatest mathematicians of the twentieth century. In his obituary, fellow algebraist BL van der Waerden says that her mathematical originality was "absolute beyond comparison", and Hermann Weyl said that Noether "changed the face of algebra by her work". During her lifetime and even until today, Noether has been characterized as the greatest woman mathematician in recorded history by mathematicians such as Pavel Alexandrov, Hermann Weyl, and Jean Dieudonné.

In a letter to The New York Times, Albert Einstein wrote:

On 2 January 1935, a few months before her death, mathematician Norbert Wiener wrote that 

At an exhibition at the 1964 World's Fair devoted to Modern Mathematicians, Noether was the only woman represented among the notable mathematicians of the modern world.

Noether has been honored in several memorials,
 The Association for Women in Mathematics holds a Noether Lecture to honor women in mathematics every year; in its 2005 pamphlet for the event, the Association characterizes Noether as "one of the great mathematicians of her time, someone who worked and struggled for what she loved and believed in. Her life and work remain a tremendous inspiration".
 Consistent with her dedication to her students, the University of Siegen houses its mathematics and physics departments in buildings on the Emmy Noether Campus.
 The German Research Foundation (Deutsche Forschungsgemeinschaft) operates the Emmy Noether Programme, providing funding to early-career researchers to rapidly qualify for a leading position in science and research by leading an independent junior research group.
 A street in her hometown, Erlangen, has been named after Emmy Noether and her father, Max Noether.
 The successor to the secondary school she attended in Erlangen has been renamed as the Emmy Noether School.
 A series of high school workshops and competitions are held in her honor in May of each year since 2001, originally hosted by a subsequent woman mathematics Privatdozent of the University of Göttingen.
 Perimeter Institute for Theoretical Physics annually awards Emmy Noether Visiting Fellowships to outstanding female theoretical physicists. Perimeter Institute is also home to the Emmy Noether Council, a group of volunteers made up of international community, corporate and philanthropic leaders work together to increase the number of women in physics and mathematical physics at Perimeter Institute.
 The Emmy Noether Mathematics Institute in Algebra, Geometry and Function Theory in the Department of Mathematics and Computer Science, Bar-Ilan University, Ramat Gan, Israel was jointly founded in 1992 by the university, the German government and the Minerva Foundation with the aim to stimulate research in the above fields and to encourage collaborations with Germany. Its main topics are Algebraic Geometry, Group theory and Complex Function Theory. Its activities includes local research projects, conferences, short-term visitors, post-doc fellowships, and the Emmy Noether lectures (an annual series of distinguished lectures). ENI is a member of ERCOM: "European Research Centers of Mathematics".
 In 2013, The European Physical Society established the Emmy Noether Distinction for Women in Physics. Winners have included Dr Catalina Curceanu, Prof Sibylle Günter and Prof Anne L'Huillier.

In fiction, Emmy Nutter, the physics professor in "The God Patent" by Ransom Stephens, is based on Emmy Noether.

Farther from home,
 The crater Nöther on the far side of the Moon is named after her.
 The minor planet 7001 Noether is named for Emmy Noether.
 Google put a memorial doodle created by Google artist Sophie Diao on Google's homepage in many countries on 23 March 2015 to celebrate Emmy Noether's 133rd birthday.
 On 6 November 2020, a satellite named after her (ÑuSat 13 or "Emmy", COSPAR 2020-079E) was launched into space.

List of doctoral students

Eponymous mathematical topics

 Noetherian
 Noetherian group
 Noetherian ring
 Noetherian module
 Noetherian space
 Noetherian induction
 Noetherian scheme
 Noether normalization lemma
 Noether problem
 Noether's theorem
 Noether's second theorem
 Lasker–Noether theorem
 Skolem–Noether theorem
 Brauer–Noether theorem
 Albert–Brauer–Hasse–Noether theorem

See also
 Timeline of women in science

Notes

References

Selected works by Emmy Noether (in German)

 
 
 
 
 
  Original German image with link to Tavel's English translation

Additional sources
 
 
 
 
 
 
 
 
 
 
 
 
 
 
 
 
 
 
 
 
 
 
 
 
  
 
 
 
 
 
 
 
 
 
 
 
 . Reprinted in 
 

External links

Personal documents
 . Noether's application for admission to the University of Erlangen and three curricula vitae, two of which are shown in handwriting, with transcriptions. The first of these is in Emmy Noether's own handwriting.
 
Photographs
 
 
Academic biographies
 
 
 
 
 .
 
 2019 Interdisciplinary conference on the occasion of the 100th anniversary of Emmy Noether's habilitation  organized by :de:Exzellenzcluster MATH+; Central Women's Representative, :de:Freie Universität Berlin and :de:Max-Planck-Institut für Wissenschaftsgeschichte (in German)
 

Newspaper articles
 
 
Audio discussions
 

1882 births
1935 deaths
20th-century German inventors
20th-century German mathematicians
20th-century German scientists
20th-century German physicists
20th-century women scientists
20th-century women mathematicians
20th-century German women
Converts to Lutheranism from Judaism
Algebraists
Bryn Mawr College faculty
Institute for Advanced Study visiting scholars
Jewish emigrants from Nazi Germany to the United States
German Jews
German women mathematicians
German women physicists
Women inventors
Jewish women scientists
Jewish physicists
Jewish scientists
People from Erlangen
People from the Kingdom of Bavaria
Academic staff of the University of Göttingen
University of Erlangen-Nuremberg alumni